Christopher James Huntington (born 29 March 1987) is an English former first-class cricketer.

Huntington was born at Chelmsford in March 1987. He was educated at Felsted School before going up to Anglia Ruskin University. While studying at Anglia Ruskin, he played first-class cricket for Cambridge UCCE in 2006–07, making five appearances. Huntington scored 111 runs in his five matches, at an average of 13.87 and a high score of 40.

Notes and references

External links

1987 births
Living people
Sportspeople from Chelmsford
People educated at Felsted School
Alumni of Anglia Ruskin University
English cricketers
Cambridge MCCU cricketers